is a professional Japanese baseball player. He plays infielder for the Hiroshima Toyo Carp.

References 

1994 births
Living people
Baseball people from Osaka Prefecture
Japanese baseball players
Nippon Professional Baseball infielders
Hiroshima Toyo Carp players